Allan Peterson may refer to:

Allan Peterson (poet), American poet 
Allan Pettersson (1911–1980), Swedish composer